Elinor Anne Harvie (born April 7, 1965) is a Canadian actress who portrayed Morticia on The New Addams Family. Later, she starred as Dr. Lindsey Novak in Stargate SG-1 and Stargate Atlantis.

Harvie was the youngest of five children born into a U.S. Air Force family. They eventually settled in Prince Albert, Saskatchewan. Harvie later attended the University of Manitoba, where she earned a degree in political studies. After graduating, Harvie moved to Vancouver with her family in 1987, where she took up a two-year course at the Vancouver Playhouse Theatre School.

Her love of stand-up comedy and improv led to extra work in TheatreSports. After training at the Vancouver Playhouse Acting School, Harvie embarked on years of theatre touring British Columbia's schools with "Greenthumb Theatre", performing in scads of Fringe Festivals and then the big stages.

As part of the Vancouver TheatreSports team, Harvie won the 1995 Just for Laughs Improv Tournament championship held in Montreal, beating competitors from across the world.

Harvie also appeared in  Cupid, The X-Files, Nightscream and The 6th Day. She received a gold medal in CBC's 1998 Improv Olympics and a Gemini nomination for Best Comedy Performance in a series or Special. She also took over from Wendie Malick as Burdine Maxwell from the second TV season of Bratz.

She portrayed Candace/Mrs. Bubkes on the YTV teen comedy series, Some Assembly Required.

On November 24, 2012 Harvie hosted the inaugural UBCP/ACTRA Awards, which honours acting talent in British Columbia.

Harvie has also starred as Lillian Tibbett on Hallmark Movies & Mysteries Channel Series An Aurora Teagarden Mystery Series (2015–present).

Filmography
 Reap What You Sew: An Aurora Teagarden Mystery (2018 TV Film Series) as Lillian Tibbett
 Last Scene Alive: An Aurora Teagarden Mystery (2018 TV Film Series) as Lillian Tibbett
 A Bundle of Trouble: An Aurora Teagarden Mystery (2017 TV Film Series) as Lillian Tibbett
 Dead Over Heels: An Aurora Teagarden Mystery (2017 TV Film Series) as Lillian Tibbett
 The Julius House: An Aurora Teagarden Mystery (2016 TV Film Series) as Lillian Tibbett
 Three Bedrooms, One Corpse: An Aurora Teagarden Mystery (2016 TV Film Series) as Lillian Tibbett
 Real Murders: An Aurora Teagarden Mystery (2015 TV Film Series) as Lillian Tibbett
 Aurora Teagarden Mystery: A Bone to Pick (2015 TV Film Series) as Lillian Tibbett
 Some Assembly Required (2014-2016) as Candace
 Home Alone 5: The Holiday Heist (2012) as Catherine Baxter
 Tooth Fairy (2010) as Permit Woman
  Santa Buddies (2009) (V) (as Ellie Harvey) as Pete’s Mom
  Love Happens (2009) as Martha
  I Love You, Beth Cooper (2009) as Female Cop at High School
  Space Buddies (2009) (V) as Pete’s Mom
  Sanctuary as Eleanor (1 TV episode); in Sanctuary for All: Part 1 (2008)
  The Valet (2008) as the Restaurant Manager
  Gym Teacher: The Movie (2008) (TV) as Ms. Schoenborn
  Space Chimps (2008) (voice) as Additional Voices
  Robson Arms as Female Contractor (1 TV episode); in Trixie's Honour (2008)
  The Triple Eight as Opportunistic Businesswoman (1 TV episode); in Heil Filters
  The Troop (2008) TV series as Charlotte Collins (unknown episodes)
  Tom and Jerry Tales (2008) TV series as Rhino Mother
  Love Notes (2007) (TV) as Claire
  Blood Ties as  Rachel (1 TV episode); in Post Partum (2007) TV episode as Rachel
  My Baby Is Missing (2007) (TV) as Nicole/Lynne
  Psych as  Lorraine (1 TV episode)’ in He Loves Me, He Loves Me Not, He Loves Me, Oops He's Dead (2007)
  Men in Trees as  Clerk (1 TV episode); in Take It Like a Man (2007)
  Christmas on Chestnut Street (2006) (TV) as Eileen Goldberg
  The Mermaid Chair (2006) (TV) as Benne
  Not My Life (2006) (TV) as Janet
  The L Word as Janice (2 TV episodes); in Lifesize (2006) & Lost Weekend (2006)
  The Collector as Meter Maid / The Devil (1 TV episode); in The V.J. (2006)
  The Foursome (2006) as Peggy Spencer
  Firehouse Tales (2005) as Additional Voices 
  Stargate: Atlantis as Dr. Lindsey Novak (2 TV episodes); in Critical Mass (2005) & The Siege: Part 3 (2005)
  Terminal City as Alice (6 TV episodes); in Episode * 1.7, Episode * 1.6, Episode * 1.5,  Episode * 1.4, Episode * 1.3, & 1 more
  Company Man (2005)
  RoundTable (1 TV episode); in Bad Gigs (2005) TV episode
  Alien Racers (2005) TV series as Gamekeeper Kytani (Episodes 1-26)
  Stargate SG-1 as Dr. Lindsey Novak (1 TV episode); in Prometheus Unbound (2004)
  Jiminy Glick in Lalawood (2004) as June
  The Dead Zone as Pam Tanowitz (1 TV episode); in Speak Now (2004)
  The Wild Guys (2004) as Carla
  The Chris Isaak Show as Stella (1 TV episode); in Taking Off (2004)
  Miracle (2004) as Margie
  Romeo! as Ms. Guthrie (1 TV episode); in Nuthin But Net
  K-9: P.I. (2002) (V) (as Ellie Harvey) as Jackie Von Jarvis
  The Western Alienation Comedy Hour (2002) (TV) as  Sketch Comedian
  Andromeda (1 TV episode); in Tunnel at the End of the Light (2002)
  JAG as Realtor (1 TV episode); in Port Chicago (2002)
  Cold Squad as Shelley Mack (2 TV episodes); in Ambleton (2002), & Enough Is Enough (2002)
  Croon (2002) (TV) as Ellie
  The Sports Pages (2001) (TV) as Melinda (segment "The Heidi Bowl")
  Da Vinci's Inquest as Jessica (1 TV episode); in All Tricked Up (2000)
  Improv Comedy Games (2000) TV mini-series as Comedian
  The 6th Day (2000) as Rosie
  P.R. (2000) TV series as Jill Hayes (unknown episodes)
  So Weird as Dr. Daily (1 TV episode); in Shelter (2000)
  Mentors as Cleopatra (1 TV episode); in The Crush (2000)
  Up, Up, and Away! (2000) (TV) as The Annihilator
  First Wave as Marianne (1 TV episode); in All About Eddie (1999)
  Beggars and Choosers (1 TV episode); in Always Leave 'Em Laughing (1999)
  The New Addams Family as Morticia Addams (65 episodes) 
  Cupid as Brassy redhead (1 TV episode); in Pilot (1998)
  Someone to Love Me (1998) (TV) as Ms. Krasne
  Wrongfully Accused (1998) as Ruth the News Anchor
  The Improv Comedy Olympics (1998) (TV) as Comedian
  Principal Takes a Holiday (1998) (TV) as Miss W. Fassle
  Saving Grace (1998) as Eva
  Mr. Magoo (1997) (scenes deleted)
  Police Academy: The Series as  Hazel Mullins (1 TV episode); in All at Sea (1997)
  The Accident: A Moment of Truth Movie (1997) (TV) as English Teacher
  Poltergeist: The Legacy as  Laura DuMond   (2 TV episodes); in Lives in the Balance (1997), &  Transference (1997) TV episode as  Mary Pastor
  NightScream (1997) (TV) as Jenny Marks
  Exception to the Rule (1997) as Secretary
  Super Dave's All Stars (1997) TV series as Cheerleader (unknown episodes)
  Dog's Best Friend (1997) (TV) as Miss Melrose
  The X-Files as OPO Staffer / Ticket Agent (2 TV episodes); in "Hell Money" (1996), & "E.B.E." (1994) (uncredited) as the Ticket Agent
  Happy Gilmore (1996) as Registrar
  Live TV (1996)
  Channel 92 (1995) (TV) as  Maxine
  The Commish as  Jenny Day (1 TV episode); in The Sharp Pinch (1993)
  Christmas on Division Street (1991) (TV) as Nurse

References

External links 
 
 

Canadian film actresses
Canadian television actresses
Canadian voice actresses
Living people
People from Belleville, Ontario
1965 births